This page shows the results of the archery competition at the 1995 Pan American Games, held from March 11 to March 26, 1995, in Mar del Plata, Argentina.

Men's competition

Recurve

Recurve 30 m

Recurve 50 m

Recurve 70 m

Recurve 90 m

Recurve Teams

Women's competition

Recurve

Recurve 30 m

Recurve 50 m

Recurve 60 m

Recurve 70 m

Recurve Teams

Medal table

See also
Archery at the 1996 Summer Olympics

References
 Sports 123

P
1995
Events at the 1995 Pan American Games